The Paroli (pl. Parolis; en: gorget patch, collar tab, or patch) was initially the designation for the coloured gorget patches of the Austro-Hungarian Army. It is applied on the gorget of a uniform coat or jacket and the battle-dress blouse. The Parolis indicated the egalisation colour and served as discrimination criteria of the 102 infantry regiments of the Austro-Hungarian Army, as well as dragoon regiment (mounted infantry) and the regiment of the uhlans (light cavalry). In other German-speaking armed forces, the designation was called Kragenpatte, Kragenspiegel, or Arabesque.

Paroli in the Austro-Hungarian Army 
In the Austro-Hungarian Army, two Parolis (on the left and right side) were applied to the front part of the uniform gorget on the coat, Waffenrock (en: service uniform, dress uniform and/or battle-dress blouse), as indicated below. Rank stars and special badges could be attached as appropriate and indicated below.
 On uniform coat – a curved tongue with the upward-directed point, the lower end of the point broadens with a bottom in the center.
On battle-dress blouse with stand-up collar – broad Parolis were covering approximately 1/5th of the gorget length. Rank stars, color stripes of cloth, piping, and special badges were attached to the front area.
After 1916, broad Parolis were replaced by smaller ones, with vertical color stripes of cloth on the end.

The rank stars of the rank groups gemeine, charges, and Unteroffiziere (NCOs) were made from white celluloid. However, since the year 1913 Paroli rank stars to Stabsfeldwebel and Kadett were made from white silk. Offiziersstellvertreter (officer deputy) rank stars were made from brass, and the rank stars designated for Fähnrich and officers were metallic gold-plated or silver-plated. In cases of self-procurement, metal embroidered rank stars were allowed.

Examples 

The galleries below show examples of Parolis: 
on the pike-grey battle-dress blouse or coat, as per order of 1908 or 1916

 Special Parolis on the pike-grey battle-dress blouse, as per the order of 1916

Paroli in Austria today 

The system of rank insignia on military uniforms remains almost unchanged since the Austro-Hungarian Empire was established. Slight changes in wording has occurred, such as changing "paroli with distinction star" to "distinction insignia". However, today only the curved tongue on the coat with the upwards directed point is designated as Paroli.

The gallery below shows some examples of the today's Austrian Bundesheer.

Sources 
 Adjustierungsvorschrift für die k. u. k. gemeinsame Armee, die k.k. Landwehr, die k.u. Landwehr, die verbundenen Einrichtungen und das Corps der Militär-Beamten. (Theil III) Herausgegeben mit Genehmigung des k.u.k. Kriegsministeriums durch die k.u.k. Hofdruckerei von Erich Christl, Bozen 1912.
 Johann C. Allmayer-Beck, Erich Lessing: Die K.u.k. Armee. 1848–1918. Verlag Bertelsmann, München 1974, .
 Stefan Rest: Des Kaisers Rock im ersten Weltkrieg. Verlag Militaria, Wien 2002, 
 Das k.u.k. Heer im Jahre 1895 Schriften des Heeresgeschichtlichen Museums in Wien - Leopold Stocker Verlag, Graz 1997

Austro-Hungarian Army
Military insignia
Military of Austria-Hungary
Military ranks of Austria